Paris Concert is a live album by the short-lived jazz group Circle, which consisted of saxophonist Anthony Braxton, pianist Chick Corea, bassist David Holland and drummer Barry Altschul, recorded in 1971 and released in 1972 on the ECM label.

Reception 
The AllMusic review by Scott Yanow stated: "The music is often quite abstract but generally colorful and innovative; Chick Corea would soon break up the band for other musical adventures, but this set remains one of the high points of his productive career".

Track listing 
Disc One
 "Nefertiti" (Wayne Shorter) – 19:14
 "Song for the Newborn" (Dave Holland) – 6:57
 "Duet" (Anthony Braxton, Chick Corea) – 10:31
 "Lookout Farm" (Dave Liebman) / "73 Degrees Kelvin [Variation 3]" (Braxton) – 16:06
Disc Two
 "Toy Room" / "Q & A" (Holland) – 24:41
 "No Greater Love" (Isham Jones, Marty Symes) – 17:37

Recorded at the Maison de l'O.R.T.F. in Paris, France, on February 21, 1971

Personnel 
 Anthony Braxton – reeds, percussion
 Chick Corea – piano
 David Holland – double bass, cello
 Barry Altschul – drums & percussion

References

External links 
 

ECM Records live albums
1972 live albums
Albums produced by Manfred Eicher
Circle (jazz band) albums